Hashtrud and Charuymaq (electoral district) is the 12th electoral district in the East Azerbaijan Province of Iran. This electoral district has a population of 93,567 and elects 1 member of parliament.

1980
MP in 1980 from the electorate of Hashtrud. (1st)
 Hassan Pourmirghaffari

1984
MP in 1984 from the electorate of Hashtrud. (2nd)
 Ali Abdollahpour

1988
MP in 1988 from the electorate of Hashtrud and Charuymaq. (3rd)
 Ghaffar Esmaeili

1992
MP in 1992 from the electorate of Hashtrud and Charuymaq. (4th)
 Ghaffar Esmaeili

1996
MP in 1996 from the electorate of Hashtrud and Charuymaq. (5th)
 Mohammad Shahi-Arablu

2000
MP in 2000 from the electorate of Hashtrud and Charuymaq. (6th)
 Mohammad Shahi-Arablu

2004
MP in 2004 from the electorate of Hashtrud and Charuymaq. (7th)
 Ghaffar Esmaeili

2008
MP in 2008 from the electorate of Hashtrud and Charuymaq. (8th)
 Ghaffar Esmaeili

2012
MP in 2012 from the electorate of Hashtrud and Charuymaq. (9th)
 Gholam Hosein Shiri Aliabad

2016

Notes

References

Electoral districts of East Azerbaijan
Hashtrud County
Charuymaq County
Deputies of Hashtrud and Charuymaq